The Oldsmobile Omega is a compact car manufactured and marketed from 1973 to 1984 by Oldsmobile, as the brand's most affordable, entry level vehicle — across three distinct generations.  

The first two generations of the Omega used rear-wheel-drive configuration, as a badge engineered variant of the Chevrolet Nova. The third generation was marketed from 1980–1984 in a front-wheel-drive, as a variation of the Chevrolet Citation.

The omega nameplate derived from the last letter of the Greek alphabet.

First generation (1973–1974) 

The Omega was one of three X-body Chevrolet Nova clones. It and the Buick Apollo were introduced in 1973; the Pontiac Ventura had been introduced in 1971. Naturally it shared the Nova's body and many of its mechanicals, but it had its own unique nose and tail, and, being an Oldsmobile, it had a little fancier trim than the Nova. It even borrowed the Nova's dashboard, but Olds added woodgrain trim to it for a more upscale look.

The front grille sported Oldsmobile's trademark split "waterfall" grille design, round headlights set into square recesses, and parking lights directly below in the bumper. Body styles mirrored that of the Nova, including a 2-door coupe, 3-door hatchback, or a 4-door sedan.

Engine choices were the standard Chevy-built 4.1-litre (250 cid) I6 with a 3-speed manual transmission standard, with a 4-speed manual or a 2- or 3-speed automatic optional. The lone V8 was Oldsmobile's 5.7 L (350 cid) "Rocket" V8, which had a 4-speed manual as standard with the 3-speed automatic optional. V8 models with the fifth VIN digit being the letter "K" received a 4-barrel Rochester carburetor. All other V8 engines received the standard 2-barrel version. There were also 53 "Doctor Oldsmobile Omega" built in 1973. All were V8's built in Van Nuys, California and were sold at Century Oldsmobile in Van Nuys, California. This decal option was canceled in 1974.

There were few changes in 1974. There was a base model and the upper-level Brougham and the S option was added. The parking lights were relocated inboard below the grille instead of the headlights and there was a new rear bumper design which met the federal government's new 5-mph impact standards. The 2-speed Powerglide transmission was dropped.

Second generation (1975–1979) 

This car was the top of the X-body line along with Buick's Apollo and Skylark, having more luxury trimming, more noise insulation, rear anti-roll bars, and other features not found on the Chevrolet Nova. There were four basic Oldsmobile X bodied cars, the F-85 (the base car), the Omega, Omega SX, and the Omega Brougham. During the 1975-76 model years, the top engine choice was a 350 cu. in. (5.7 Liter) V8 from GM's Buick division. During that time, the base engine was the  250 cu. in. (4.1 Liter) inline-6 from Chevrolet, until 1977 when it was dropped in favor of the lighter  Buick 231 V6. It saw few changes through its life being limited mostly to the front end (with three different grille designs) and to the rear lights, changing the number of lenses through the years. The Oldsmobile 260 (4.3-liter) V8 was available as an option from 1975-79.

Third generation (1980–1984) 

The X-bodies were all-new front-wheel drive cars for 1980. Engine choices included Pontiac's Iron Duke inline-four engine and the new corporate 2.8 L LE2 V6 designed specifically for this platform. Transmissions were the 4 speed manual or the TH125 3-speed automatic.

Unlike the Chevrolet Citation, which the car was based on, the Omega range consisted of a 2-door coupe and 4-door sedan, with upright styling and a split grille.

Aside from the standard and Brougham models offered of the duration of production, sportier models were also offered.  These included the SX coupe (replaced by the ES in 1982), ES sedan.  The SportOmega pioneered urethane plastic fenders in 1981 and featured red-and-orange striping, white-over-gray paint, and a sloping front grille shared with the SX and ES. Notably, the sportier models were available with both the L4 and V6 engines.

Beginning in 1982, the Chevrolet high-output (130 horsepower) 2.8L V6 became available on ES models. In 1983, the ES was only available in the sedan body style.

The X-body Omega, like its rebadged variants (the Chevrolet Citation, Pontiac Phoenix and Buick Skylark), proved fairly trouble-prone early on, necessitating a number of government-mandated recalls for braking problems, fluid leaks and suspension issues.  While Omega was the only one of the four X-cars to sell better in 1981 than in 1980 (147,918 versus 134,323), starting in 1982, production fell dramatically.  Only 77,469 Omegas were built in '82, with 53,926 in 1983 and 52,986 in swan-song 1984.

For 1985, the Omega was replaced by the N-body Calais.

References 

Compact cars
Front-wheel-drive vehicles
Omega
Rear-wheel-drive vehicles
Coupés
Sedans
Hatchbacks
1970s cars
1980s cars